The Somerset towers, church towers built in the 14th to 16th centuries, have been described as among England's finest contributions to medieval art. The paragraphs and descriptions below describe features of some of these towers. The organization follows Peter Poyntz-Wright's scheme for grouping the towers by what he understands to be roughly the date and group of mason-architects who built them. Poyntz-Wright's scheme came under criticism in the 1980s.

Churchill generation

These churches have smaller towers with a single window in each face of the top stage; a pierced top parapet without merlons and four square-set corner pinnacles above.

Cheddar generation

These churches have three windows in each face of the top stage; diagonal buttressing; some with squareset corner pinnacles; some with buttress pinnacles. These range from simple to elaborate designs: (Bleadon, shortly before 1390; Brent Knoll, about 1397; Mark, about 1407; Weare, about 1407; Banwell, about 1417; Cheddar, about 1423; and Winscombe, around 1435.)

Mendip generation

Continues with the triple windows, but with a heavier groundplan featuring heavier buttresses braced diagonally back onto their walls and across the corner; pinnacles diagonal to the tower plan: (Shepton Mallet, about 1423; Cranmore, about 1440; Mells, 1446; Bruton, about 1456; and Leigh-on-Mendip, about 1464)

Winford generation

These churches are contemporary with the Mendip Generation, but more akin to the Churchill group; conveying a sense of great height; single window per face in the top stage as well as lower stages; buttresses set back away from the corners and stepped at stage junctions and middles of stages; square-set pinnacles and most without merlons: (Portishead, about 1420; Backwell, possibly 1428; Winford and Chew Magna, about 1437; Kilmersdon, about 1443; Dundry, 1448 or earlier; Batheaston, about 1458; Publow, about 1467; Wellow, about 1475; and Yeovil St. John the Baptist, around 1480)

Long panel generation

This group (including Wrington, about 1449; Wells St. Cuthbert, about 1456; and Evercreech, about 1462) -- window or bell-opening panels rise through several stages, emphasizing the towers' verticality.

Langport generation

This group (including Langport, about 1455; Long Sutton, about 1462; Westonzoyland, about 1470; Muchelney, possibly 1468)

Shepton Beauchamp generation

On these churches, each face of the top stage bears a window panel extending down into the stage below: (including Shepton Beauchamp, around 1477; Norton Sub Hamdon, around 1485; and Hinton St George, around 1492)

Developmental/experimental

Lyng and Middlezoy (combining Langport, Cheddar and Mendip features with new features) and Taunton St. James and Bishops Lydeard (which initiate a West Somerset ground plan)

West Somerset generation

(Including Kingston St Mary, about 1507; Hatch Beauchamp, about 1509; Staple Fitzpaine, perhaps 1513; Isle Abbots, about 1517; Huish Episcopi, about 1524)

West Somerset specials
(Taunton St. Mary, about 1503, but rebuilt in 1862 as an accurate copy; North Petherton, about 1508; Wellington about 1510; and Kingsbury Episcopi, about 1515)

South Somerset specials

These are some of the less elaborate towers of South Somerset: Queen Camel, around 1491; Mudford, about 1498; Kingsdon, about 1505; Martock, about 1511; Chard 1520, but possibly earlier; and Charlton Horethorne, about 1523.

Somerset crossing towers

Perpendicular style, but built on the four arches at the intersection of the nave and chancel: Axbridge, about 1400; Wedmore base around 1400 and parapet about 1540; Yatton, around 1400; Dunster, 1442; Crewkerne, about 1480; Ilminster 1500 to 1525.

Other Somerset towers

Poyntz Wright also uses his systematics to date some small towers: Nempnett Thrubwell at around 1468; Chew Stoke about 1475; West Pennard at about 1482; Charlton Musgrove at perhaps around 1490; Pylle at about 1497; Cloford after 1500. He also pegs three of the smaller towers in the western part of Somerset: Combe Florey about 1499; Fivehead, around 1505; and Langford Budville, 1509. The end of the Perpendicular period in architecture coincides with construction of Ruishton, 1533; Chedzoy, 1539; and Batcombe and Chewton Mendip, around 1540.

See also
 English Gothic architecture

References

External links

.Somerset towers, list
Somerset towers, list
Somerset towers, List
Towers
Somerset towers, List
Somerset towers, List
Somerset towers, List
Somerset